Helluobrochus is a genus of beetles in the family Carabidae, containing the following species:

 Helluobrochus anthracinus (Klug, 1834)
 Helluobrochus ares Reichardt, 1974
 Helluobrochus argus Reichardt, 1974
 Helluobrochus bacchus (Reichardt, 1972)
 Helluobrochus bechynei Reichardt, 1974
 Helluobrochus birai Reichardt, 1974
 Helluobrochus brasiliensis (Dejean, 1825)
 Helluobrochus brevicollis (Dejean, 1831)
 Helluobrochus bucki Reichardt, 1974
 Helluobrochus capixaba Reichardt, 1974
 Helluobrochus collaris (Chaudoir, 1877)
 Helluobrochus cribratus (Reiche, 1843)
 Helluobrochus cribricollis (Chaudoir, 1872)
 Helluobrochus darlingtoni Reichardt, 1974
 Helluobrochus horqueta Reichardt, 1974
 Helluobrochus inconspicuus (Chaudoir, 1848)
 Helluobrochus lacordairei (Dejean, 1831)
 Helluobrochus linearis (Bates, 1871)
 Helluobrochus luctuosus (Chaudoir, 1872)
 Helluobrochus negrei Reichardt, 1974
 Helluobrochus oculatus Reichardt, 1974
 Helluobrochus oopselaphus Reichardt, 1974
 Helluobrochus petrus Reichardt, 1974
 Helluobrochus pilipalpis Reichardt, 1974
 Helluobrochus sanguinolentus (Klug, 1834)
 Helluobrochus subrostratus (Bates, 1871)

References

Anthiinae (beetle)